Oldřich Vlasák (born 26 November 1955) is a conservative politician who advocates for the interests of self-governing municipalities, cities and regions. He served as Vice-President of the European Parliament between 2012 and 2014.

Biography
Vlasák was born in Hradec Králové. He studied at the Czech Technical University in Prague. After graduating he worked in science as a technical professional in the field of the environment. In his following management career he worked for the private sector. He joined the Civic Democratic Party in 1991 and entered local politics in 1994, when he was elected member of the Board of Representatives of the City of Hradec Králové. Between 1998 and 2004 he was mayor of the City. In 2001 Vlasák became the President of the Union of Towns and Municipalities of the Czech Republic. He entered European politics in 2000. He was delegated to the Congress of Local and Regional Authorities of Europe and represented the Czech Republic as an observer in the Committee of the Regions. After his active work in the Policy Committee of the Council of European Municipalities and Regions (CEMR) he was elected its executive president. Between 2004 and 2014 he was a Member of the European Parliament (MEP). In the European Parliament he acted as coordinator of European Conservatives and Reformists in the Committee for Regional Development and was a vice chairman of the Intergroup Urban. In 2012 he became responsible for STOA in the European Parliament Bureau. His time as an MEP ceased in 2014.

Publications
Evropská unie očima studentů; Evropská unie očima podnikatelů; Evropská unie očima občanů ČR; 15 let ODS ve Východočeském a Královéhradeckém regionu; Budoucnost kohezní politiky; co-author of the books Evropská parlamentní demokracie, Naše obce a města v Evropské unii, Naše města a evropské peníze. 
 Publisher of the INFO information bulletin. Publications to accompany exhibitions in the European Parliament: III. odboj v Československu ('The third resistance movement in Czechoslovakia') and 100 let mezinárodního ledního hokeje ('100 years of international ice hockey').

References

External links
Oldrich Vlasak, Vice President of European Parliament filmneweurope.com, June 13, 2014
 
 Vlasak Net

1955 births
Living people
Politicians from Hradec Králové
Civic Democratic Party (Czech Republic) MEPs
MEPs for the Czech Republic 2004–2009
MEPs for the Czech Republic 2009–2014
Czech Technical University in Prague alumni